Jungle Terry or Jungleterry, from  jangal tarāi, meaning 'jungle lowland', was a term applied in the 18th century to an area bordering Bengal and Bihar that included large tracts of Bhagalpur and Monghyr districts, as well as the Santal Parganas district.

Although named as such, rather than an official district the Jungle Terry was a vague border area. The district named Jungle Mahals would be established later in 1805.

Geography
The Jungle Terry was located in the present-day Indian states of West Bengal, Bihar and Jharkhand. It was an ill-defined thickly forested region inhabited by tribal groups such as the Bhumij, the Santhal and the Munda people. William Hodges mentions that the Jungle Terry was located to the west of Bauglepore (Bhagalpur).

The area included the Rajmahal Hills; towns that were close to the area according to James Browne included, besides Bauglepoor or Boglypour (Bhagalpur), Curruckpoor (Haveli Kharagpur), Colgong (Kahalgaon), Birboom (Birbhum), Curruckdea (Kharagdiha) and Guidore (Gidhaur).

Map number two of James Rennell's 1779 Bengal Atlas has the title "Jungleterry District", but the name 'Jungle Terry' itself does not show on the map. Bishop Reginald Heber comments that the "Jungleterry" district is very fertile and that theft, murder and highway robberies are a rare occurrence in it.

See also
Jungle Mahals

References

External links
 Bengal District Gazetteers Bankura, O’Malley, L.S.S., 1908, Barcode(6010010076000), Language English, Geography,Travels And Description from Digital Library of India 
The Jungleterry District map
The Jungle and the Aroma of Meats: An Ecological Theme in Hindu Medicine
Forest Tenures in the Jungle Mahals of South West Bengal

Bengal Presidency
History of Bihar
History of Jharkhand
Districts of British India